In the Star Wars universe, Mon Calamari may refer to:

The Mon Calamari (fictional race), amphibious humanoids
Mon Calamari (fictional planet) (or Mon Cala, or Dac), their homeworld